Equatoguinean Americans are Americans of Equatoguinean descent.

Demographics
Equatoguineans are a small minority in the United States, with less than 300 individuals in 2000.

Notable people
 Gus Envela, Jr.
 Gustavo Envela-Makongo, Sr.
 Andrés Malango
 Donato Malango

See also
Equatorial Guinea–United States relations

References

 
American
Central Africans in the United States